Bartlett is a village located in Cook, DuPage and Kane counties, Illinois. A small parcel on the western border is in Kane County. The population was 41,105 at the 2020 census.

History
In its earliest times, the Village of Bartlett, Illinois was served as a hunting and camping ground for the Cherokee, Miami, Potawatomi, and Ottawa Indians. Throughout the past, the Northwest Territory, Virginia, Indiana, Spain, France and England had staked their claim for Bartlett. However, the territory was owned by a man named Luther Bartlett. Luther and Sophia Bartlett had decided that a station stop would be beneficial for their town and townspeople. In 1873, Bartlett gave a monetary contribution and half of his 40-acre woodlot towards the construction for a train depot, which is why the town is named after Luther Bartlett. Bartlett later became one of the premiere pig towns, becoming their main export for years to come. A petition for incorporation was filed in Springfield on February 11, 1891. The village was incorporated on June 21, 1892. Bartlett experienced the majority of its population growth in the 1980s.

Geography

Demographics

As of the 2020 census there were 41,105 people, 13,515 households, and 10,867 families residing in the village. The racial makeup of the village was 66.23% White, 17.95% Asian, 2.53% African American, 0.42% Native American, 0.03% Pacific Islander, 4.51% from other races, and 8.34% from two or more races. Hispanic or Latino of any race were 12.04% of the population.

There were 13,515 households, out of which 66.87% had children under the age of 18 living with them, 68.69% were married couples living together, 8.14% had a female householder with no husband present, and 19.59% were non-families. 16.85% of all households were made up of individuals, and 8.13% had someone living alone who was 65 years of age or older. The average household size was 3.40 and the average family size was 3.02.

The village's age distribution consisted of 23.7% under the age of 18, 7.7% from 18 to 24, 23.9% from 25 to 44, 30.1% from 45 to 64, and 14.6% who were 65 years of age or older. The median age was 40.6 years. For every 100 females, there were 102.5 males. For every 100 females age 18 and over, there were 99.0 males.

The median income for a household in the village was $109,980, and the median income for a family was $123,249. Males had a median income of $66,752 versus $42,099 for females. The per capita income for the village was $41,821. About 2.6% of families and 4.2% of the population were below the poverty line, including 5.5% of those under age 18 and 6.0% of those age 65 or over.

In 2011 Bartlett had 5,918 Asian residents, more than twice the number as in 2001. Ashok Selvam of the Daily Herald of Arlington Heights, Illinois said that the Asian population growth "could be traced to construction of the BAPS Shri Swaminarayan Mandir".

Economy

Retail and commerce
Apart from the downtown area, Bartlett has a large retail area centered by the intersection of Illinois Route 59 and Stearns Road. Businesses include:

The Home Depot, Walgreens, Anytime Fitness, Fifth Third Bank, First Midwest Bank, The DuPage Health Center, Oberweis Dairy, Dunkin' Donuts, T-Mobile, AutoZone, Taco Bell, KFC, McDonald's, Wendy's, and a Starbucks.

Retail expansion
At the intersection of Illinois Route 59 and Stearns Road in The Home Depot parking area a four tenant building was voted for on October 17, 2017, successfully. The new building will include Starbucks, Great Clips, and two additional stores. The Great Clips was the first store to open in the four tenant building, leaving the older store across the street vacant.

Arts and culture

Notable features
On August 8, 2004, the BAPS organization, a sect of Hinduism, opened BAPS Shri Swaminarayan Mandir, Chicago, a large  temple, or mandir, on Illinois Route 59, just south of U.S. Route 20. Covering , it is the largest traditional Hindu mandir, of stone and marble, to be constructed in the United States.  The mandir took 16 months to build and was constructed with Turkish limestone, Italian marble, and Indian makrana marble. The adjoining cultural center, known as the Haveli, was opened in October 2000. The large complex contains large rooms with intricately carved walls of stone and wood. It attracts many visitors of all faiths.

Bartlett has retained its original railroad station, built in 1873. It is now the home of the Bartlett Depot Museum.
Bartlett had one of the largest Little League programs in the United States, managed under one board with over 1000 participants in the mid 1990s through early 2010.
Bartlett has one of the largest individual Little League Challenger Baseball programs (Special Needs Baseball / buddy ball) in the nation.
In 2013 The Bartlett Little League Challenger Division along with their Little League Illinois District 13 partners were the 15th team ever from Illinois to participate in the Little League World Series. They participated in the Challenger Exhibition game vs California District 57.
Bartlett's arts council, Arts in Bartlett, presents the village's only juried fine arts fair each year on the last weekend in June.
Bartlett Park District currently supports the Bartlett Park District Youth Theatre Troupe for ages 8 through 18.

Sports and recreation
The local park district in Bartlett also has a recreation center called Bartlett Community Center. This facility hosts a variety of sports that residents can sign up for and this includes: Adult Softball and Adult Basketball,  Youth Basketball, Youth Soccer, Youth Girls Softball, Volleyball, Swimming, and an open gym.

Government
The village of Bartlett has a mayor/council form of government. A village clerk, six trustees and a village president are elected in nonpartisan, at-large elections. They are elected for four-year terms. Elections are staggered, with three trustees elected every two years and the village clerk and president elected every four years. Municipal elections occur in odd-numbered years.

Kevin Wallace has been Bartlett's Village President since 2013.

Education

Schools 
Public schools in Bartlett schools are entirely within Elgin Area School District U46. The Elgin Area School District serves a  area in Cook, DuPage and Kane Counties.  Almost 40,000 children of school age are within its boundaries.  The Elgin Area School District is the second largest school district in Illinois.

Elgin Area School District schools located in Bartlett include:

Pre-school: Independence.
Elementary schools: Bartlett, Centennial, Sycamore Trails, Prairieview, Hawk Hollow, Nature Ridge, and Liberty.
Middle school: Eastview Middle School.  Some students who live in Bartlett attend Kenyon Woods Middle School located in South Elgin.
High school: Bartlett High School. Many students who live in Bartlett attend South Elgin High School in South Elgin.

Bartlett also has a community preschool.

Public library 
The Bartlett Public Library was opened in 1973. After outgrowing the original building, the village purchased land in 1981 and opened the new facility in 1983. The library expanded again in 1995 when a second story was added. The library has a cozy, warm, cabin-like feel due to the exposed wooden structure on the interior of the building. In 2015, more renovations to modernize the library were made including the addition of study rooms, conference rooms, and an art room in the youth and teen services department. This renovation also expanded the display area in the entrance of the library.

Media (movies) 

 Munger Road (2011) 
 Normal Life (1996)

Lifestyle 
The City of Bartlett was ranked the ninth-safest city in the United States according to the real estate market data platform NeighborhoodScout, with information analyzed from the FBI Crime Database from 2016.

There is an annual Independence Day festival that takes place located at the corner of S. Stearns and S. Bartlett Road near the Bartlett Community Center, 700 S. Bartlett Road. This festival includes a carnival with rides and games, food, beverages, free entertainment for all ages, bingo, a turtle race, a parade, on-site presence for nonprofit groups, skydivers, fireworks, and a great sense of community pride.

Notable people

Vinnie Hinostroza, professional hockey player for the Buffalo Sabres
Catherine J. Melchert, Mayor 1993–2009
Shealeigh Voitl, winner of Radio Disney's The Next Big Thing
A. C. Schultz, Wisconsin politician
Paul Christiano, choreographer and dancer
Jake Kumerow, professional football player for the Buffalo Bills

References

External links

 Village of Bartlett
 Bartlett Fire Protection District

 
Villages in Illinois
Chicago metropolitan area
Villages in DuPage County, Illinois
Villages in Kane County, Illinois
Villages in Cook County, Illinois
Populated places established in 1891
1891 establishments in Illinois